See also 1996 in birding and ornithology

Worldwide
 In Brazil a female Spix's macaw is released into the wild in the hope that it will mate with the last remaining wild bird but disappears after seven weeks.

New species
See also Bird species new to science described in the 1990s

To be completed

Taxonomic developments
To be completed

Europe

Britain

Breeding birds
 Yellow-legged gull breeds for the first time in Britain at a site in Southern England.

Migrant and wintering birds
 A large wreck of little auks occurs on North Sea coasts in November.

Rare birds
 A Rüppell's warbler near Aberdaron in Gwynedd is the first for Wales and fifth for Britain.
 A Ross's gull in Cleveland in June and an ivory gull at Inverness in July attract large numbers of birders.
 Westerly winds during October lead to an influx of North American landbirds
 A bay-breasted warbler at Land's End, Cornwall in October is the first British record
 A chestnut-sided warbler at Prawle Point, Devon in October is the second British record
 A record-breaking invasion of Arctic redpolls begins in November and continues into 1996.

Other events
 The British Birdwatching Fair has the wetlands of Morocco as its theme for the year.

Ireland

Rare birds
 Two yellow warblers in October, in County Clare and County Waterford are the first and second for Ireland

North America
To be completed

Asia
 Three sightings of sooty shearwater in the United Arab Emirates are the first records there.

References

Birding and ornithology
Birding and ornithology by year
Ornithology